The Centre for South Estonian Language and Cultural Studies is an interdisciplinary unit at the Faculty of Philosophy of Tartu University. The centre coordinates and organizes linguistic and cultural studies in the historical South Estonian (Võro, Seto, Mulgi and Tartu) area. The centre also publishes books and organizes events connected with South Estonian language and culture.

External links
 Home page of the centre in Võro and Estonian

South Estonian language
Estonian culture
Education in Tartu